The Prize of the Foundation for Polish Science is the most prestigious scientific award in Poland given every year from 1992 by a non-governmental non-profit Polish organization, Foundation for Polish Science. The prize is widely regarded as the top scientific award in Poland. The Prizes awarded in 2013 equal PLN 200,000 (approximately $60,000).

Since 2011, the Prize is awarded in four categories: Life Sciences; Chemical and Material Sciences; Mathematics, Physics and Engineering Sciences; as well as Humanities and Social Sciences. Candidates can be either Polish scientists working in Poland or abroad, foreign ones working there, provided that their achievement has been realized within the territory of the Republic of Poland, as well as foreigners dealing with matters pertaining to Poland.

As of 2021, 110 individuals have been awarded the prize including 9 women. Among the notable winners are: Krzysztof Matyjaszewski, Andrzej Tarkowski, Bohdan Paczyński, Timothy D. Snyder, Anna Wierzbicka, Maciej Gliwicz, Ryszard Gryglewski, Zofia Kielan-Jaworowska, Aleksander Wolszczan, Andrzej Udalski, Tomasz Dietl, Andrzej Sobolewski, and Karol Modzelewski.

Criteria
The prize honours renowned scientists for significant advancements and scientific discoveries which shift cognitive boundaries and open new perspectives for research, provide an exceptional contribution towards the advancement of our nation's progress and culture as well as assure Poland a significant position for undertaking the most ambitious challenges of the modern world. Subject of the Prize may include clearly defined and confirmed scientific achievements which have in the recent period opened new perspectives for further research.

Recipients
Source:  Foundation for Polish Science

Life Sciences

Chemical and Materials Sciences

Mathematical, Physical and Engineering Sciences

Humanities and Social Sciences

Laureates by institution

See also 

 List of general science and technology awards

References

External links
 Information on FNP website
 Recipients – FNP website
 2014 Recipients announcement

Polish science and technology awards
Polish awards